Death Hunt is a 1981 Western action film directed by Peter Hunt. The film stars Charles Bronson, Lee Marvin, Angie Dickinson, Carl Weathers, Maury Chaykin, Ed Lauter and Andrew Stevens. Death Hunt was a fictionalized account of the Royal Canadian Mounted Police (RCMP) pursuit of a man named Albert Johnson. Earlier films exploring the same topic were The Mad Trapper (1972),  a British made-for-television production and Challenge to Be Free (also known as Mad Trapper of the Yukon and Mad Trapper) (1975).

Plot
In the Yukon Territory in 1931, Albert Johnson (Charles Bronson), a solitary American trapper, comes across an organized dog fight. A white German Shepherd is badly injured and Johnson forcibly takes it, paying $200 to its owner, a vicious trapper named Hazel (Ed Lauter).

Aggrieved by his treatment and claiming the dog was stolen from him, Hazel leads several of his friends to Johnson's isolated cabin. Some begin shooting while others create a diversion. After the shooting of Sitka, the dog that Johnson has nursed back to health, the trapper kills one pursuer, Jimmy Tom (Denis Lacroix),

Once they discover that Johnson has bought 700 rounds of ammunition from the local trading post and paid in $100 bills, many conclude that he is the "mad trapper", a possibly mythical, psychopathic, serial killer who supposedly murders other trappers in the wilderness and takes their gold teeth. An old trapper, Bill Luce (Henry Beckman), warns Johnson that the law is coming for him. Johnson fortifies his cabin.

Sergeant Edgar Millen (Lee Marvin), commander of the local Royal Canadian Mounted Police post, seems a tough but humane man. He has with him a veteran tracker named "Sundog" Brown (Carl Weathers) and a young constable, Alvin Adams (Andrew Stevens), plus a new lover in Vanessa McBride (Angie Dickinson). He reluctantly agrees to investigate Hazel's accusations that Johnson stole his dog and murdered Jimmy Tom.

Millen leads a posse of mounties and trappers to the cabin. He parleys with Johnson, telling him that he has a pretty good idea of what happened and if Johnson comes with him they can get it sorted out. However, before Johnson can answer, one of the trappers opens fire. Several end up killed, including one who is shot by one of his own friends. The posse uses dynamite to blow up the cabin, but Johnson escapes, shooting dead a Mountie, Constable Hawkins (Jon Cedar).

Millen, Sundog and Adams, joined by Hazel with his tracker dogs, set off into the frozen wilderness after Johnson. The case has made front-page news across the country, and many trappers join in the chase, attracted by the $1,000 bounty that has been placed on Johnson's life. Captain Hank Tucker (Scott Hylands), a Royal Canadian Air Force pilot, is sent by the government to join the hunt, which is causing a national embarrassment. He reveals that Johnson was a member of a United States Army special intelligence unit during World War I.

Johnson utilizes a number of tracking techniques to avoid Millen's posse and the bounty hunters, living off the land in treacherous winter conditions. As the hunt continues, Millen begins to respect Johnson's uncommon abilities, while growing to resent the intrusion of so many outsiders.

Luce comes across two of the pursuing trappers and shoots them both dead before pulling out their gold teeth. Luce, it seems, is the mad trapper.

The pursuers catch up to Johnson. Tucker begins to strafe the area indiscriminately with his aircraft machine gun, killing Sundog. The enraged Millen and Adams shoot down the aircraft with their rifles; Tucker crashes into a canyon wall and is killed. Johnson escapes after killing Hazel.

Luce comes across Johnson and tries to kill him, presumably attracted by the reward. Johnson tricks him and captures him at gunpoint. Shortly thereafter Millen spots Johnson and opens fire; the bullet hits him in the face, rendering him unrecognizable. As they examine the body, Millen and Adams spot the real Johnson, dressed in Luce's clothes, on a ridge above them. The man they shot was Luce, dressed in Johnson's clothes.

As the other pursuers arrive on the scene, Adams tells them that Millen has killed Johnson. A trapper finds that the body has a pocket full of gold teeth, so they celebrate the killing of the "mad trapper".

Cast
Listed in credits order:
 Charles Bronson as Albert Johnson
 Lee Marvin as Sergeant Edgar Millen
 Andrew Stevens as Constable Alvin Adams
 Carl Weathers as George Washington Lincoln "Sundog" Brown
 Ed Lauter as Hazel
 Scott Hylands as Captain Hank Tucker
 Angie Dickinson as Vanessa McBride 
 Henry Beckman as Bill Luce
 William Sanderson as Ned Warren
 Jon Cedar as Constable Hawkins
 James O'Connell as Hurley
 Len Lesser as Lewis
 Maury Chaykin as Clarence
 August Schellenberg as Deak De Bleargue
 Dick Davalos as Beeler

Production

Development
The film was financed by Raymond Chow of Hong Kong's Golden Harvest. It was part of a six film slate worth $60 million he announced in July 1979, others including High Road to China, The Cannonball Run, and Battle Creek Brawl, plus two films that were not made, The Texans directed by Sam Peckinpah from a script by John Milius, and Horizons based on a novel by Hardy Kruger. The latter film was financed with German tax shelter money.

Chow sold the film to 20th Century Fox.

The film was originally known as Arctic Rampage. Bronson and Marvin had first worked together on You're in the Navy Now (1951). Marvin later said "Sometimes during 'Death Hunt,' I'd look over at him [Bronson], and think, 'Well, here we are, still at it, and we've held up well.' It's unusual to be able to feel that way about an old mate. Usually, you meet some actor you've known for years and you are guilty about your own success. It's, 'Gee, I've had the breaks, what the hell can I say?' And the other guy starts talking about his bad timing. 'If I'd been there, Brando never would have made it'."

Historical accuracy
Death Hunt bears little semblance to the true story of the manhunt of Albert Johnson, the reputed "Mad Trapper of Rat River". Johnson was eventually killed after a remarkable and highly publicized pursuit over several weeks. Of special note was the fact that Johnson eluded his RCMP pursuers in the dead of winter in the lower Arctic, crossing the Richardson Mountains in the process, a feat previously considered impossible. On February 17, 1932, Johnson was finally surrounded by Mounties on the frozen Eagle River, and shot and killed.

"Albert Johnson was a hero in that he survived a physical ordeal," said the film's producer Murray Shostak. "The story isn't twisted. We're not making a documentary."

World War I veteran Wop May was a bush pilot flying a Bellanca aircraft who was involved in the hunt for Johnson. Contrary to the film, May, who was portrayed as "Captain Tucker", did not wildly shoot at everyone, including the posse on the ground, nor did he get shot down. May was unscathed and lived until 1952. "There was no heavy so we elected to make it the airplane," said producer Al Ruddy. "It represents the twentieth century."

In the film numerous men are shot and killed by Johnson, but during the real manhunt this never occurred. Constable Millen was shot and killed by Johnson and was the only Mountie killed by Johnson during the manhunt. Two other RCMP officers that Johnson shot survived.

Carl Weathers was a black character working for the Mounties. Murray Shostak, the Canadian producer, said, "If you notice closely, he is not wearing the Mountie stripe on his pants. He's a sidekick."

In the film it is claimed that Johnson was a World War I veteran, with Captain Tucker providing Johnson's military service record to Millen and the other RCMP officers. According to researcher Frank W. Anderson, virtually nothing is known of Albert Johnson before his arrival at Fort McPherson on July 9, 1931. To this day, the Mad Trapper's true identity has never been established.

Bronson said about the character, "There are many men who have gone to Canada and most of them have gone because they want to be alone.... [many want to] escape from their wives. I'm not saying that's what Albert Johnson did, though... The more I read about Albert Johnson the more I felt he should be made sympathetic."

"We never set out to depict this as an accurate history of Canada," said Shostak. "You try to make it as dramatic and entertaining as possible.... We don't hide it [the fact the film was shot in Canada]. We say that it takes place in Canada and in that sense we've been more nationalistic than a lot of Canadian producers.... In the past five or 10 years, producers have been making a real effort to avoid having their films identified as Canadian because there is a silly theory that Americans won't go see films not shot in America.... We talk about Edmonton and Toronto in the film, and in most respects this is more of a Canadian film than most certified Canadian films."

"The truth is often interred with the bones," said Lee Marvin. "But you've got to think of the audience... The closest it gets [to the facts] is the snow. But it's not a documentary. Documentaries show at little theatres and at schools. I loved the movie. I've never seen so many rotten people in one film. There's not a saving grace in anybody."

Casting
Joan Collins was originally cast in the female. lead. She does not appear in the final film. Angie Dickinson accepted what was a relatively small role because she wanted to work with Bronson and Marvin and "I wanted to see Banff". She did admit "my part is so small it looks as if it's been almost cut out of the picture. It hasn't. That's it... I probably wouldn't have done it if the film had been set in Lancaster."

"I think they set out to make a piece of entertainment, not a documentary" said Canadian actor August Schellenberg who appears in the film. "Being Canadian, I've given up on historical fact after seeing Riel. Talk about a travesty - and that was with Canadian taxpayers' money. Death Hunt is American... The experience was fun. I don't think I was treated any differently than Lee Marvin. It's on Canadian films with American stars that you are treated as an also-ran."

Filming
Principal photography for Death Hunt took place in March and April 1981. Location sites included Canmore and Abraham Lake, Alberta in Canada.

The film featured a Bristol F.2b Fighter replica in RCAF markings. The aircraft was on skis and equipped with an upper wing-mounted machine gun.

Release

Home media
Death Hunt was first released on VHS by CBS/Fox video in the early 1980s. A DVD of Death Hunt was released by Anchor Bay Entertainment in January 2005. However, Anchor Bay has since lost distribution rights to the film, and the DVD was forced out of print. Shout! Factory has recently acquired the rights to the film and released it on DVD on February 1, 2011, as a double bill with Butch and Sundance: The Early Days (1979).

Reception

Box office
The film's box office performance was described as "lethargic".

Critical response
In Vincent Canby's review for The New York Times, he noted that the plot had problems. "Nothing in Death Hunt makes a great deal of sense, though the scenery is rugged and the snowscapes beautiful." Canby, however, recognized that two old pros were at work. "Mr. Bronson and Mr. Marvin are such old hands at this sort of movie that each can create a character with ease, out of thin, cold air." Reviewer Leonard Maltin characterized Death Hunt as having "... good action, but not enough of it."

Notes

References

Citations

Bibliography

 Anderson, Frank W. and Art Downs. The Death of Albert Johnson, Mad Trapper of Rat River. Surrey, British Columbia, Canada: Heritage House, 1986. .
 Lentz, Robert F. Lee Marvin: His Films and Career. Jefferson, North Carolina: McFarland & Company, Inc., 1999. .
 Maltin, Leonard. Leonard Maltin's Movie Guide 2009. New York: New American Library, 2009 (originally published as TV Movies, then Leonard Maltin’s Movie & Video Guide), First edition 1969, published annually since 1988. .
 North, Dick. The Mad Trapper of Rat River: A True Story of Canada's Biggest Manhunt. Toronto, Ontario, Canada: Macmillan Company, 1972. .
 Pigott, Peter. Flying Canucks: Famous Canadian Aviators. Toronto, Ontario, Canada: Hounslow Press, 1994. . 
 Solomon, Aubrey. Twentieth Century Fox: A Corporate and Financial History. Lanham, Maryland: Scarecrow Press, 1989. .

External links
 
 
 
 

1981 films
1980s action thriller films
1980s adventure films
American action thriller films
American Western (genre) films
1981 Western (genre) films
American chase films
American films based on actual events
Films directed by Peter R. Hunt
Films set in 1931
Films set in Yukon
Golden Harvest films
Northern (genre) films
Royal Canadian Mounted Police in fiction
20th Century Fox films
American survival films
1980s English-language films
1980s American films